Kbac or variation, may refer to:

 Kvass (kBac), a non-alcoholic Slavic fermented rye bread beverage 
 KBAC 98.1 FM Santa Fe, New Mexico, USA; a radio station
 Kalamazoo Book Arts Center, Kalamazoo, Michigan, USA; an artists non-profit
 Barnes County Municipal Airport (ICAO airport code: KBAC; FAA airport code: BAC) Valley City, North Dakota, USA; see List of airports in North Dakota
 KBAC TV 3, a fictional TV station found in Astro City, see List of Astro City characters

See also

 
 Kindergarten Behaviour and Academic Competency Scale (KBACS) for Kindergarten readiness
 
 BAC (disambiguation)
 CBAC (disambiguation)
 WBAC 1340 AM, Cleveland, Tennessee, USA; a radio station